Spring Lake is an unincorporated community in Highlands County, Florida, United States, southeast of Sebring, just outside the city limits of Sebring, adjacent to the Sebring International Raceway. It is mostly made up of senior citizens and established families with children, and The Spring Lake Golf Resort consists of three different golf courses, with many available homes and land for sale.

The Spring Lake community has its own Property Association, which is located at 6122 U.S. Highway 98, Sebring, FL. 33876-9710. It also has its own Board of Directors, annual dues and yearly budget, as well as a monthly newsletter that keeps its residents informed of such matters as the Spring Lake Bylaws, and the Spring Lake Declaration of Restrictions and Amendments.

Geography
Bordered by Lake Istokpoga, Florida's second largest lake, the community of Spring Lake is mostly flat, and consists of canals and golf course lots. The resort offers the guests and residents the ability to experience much of Florida's natural beauty. The typical lot size within the Spring Lake Golf Resort is 0.25 acres, and approximately 50 percent of the lots back up to either a golf course fairway, golf course green, or a canal.

Community golf info

There are three different golf courses within the Spring Lake Golf Resort: a par 72, 18 hole course, named Panther Creek; a par 71, 18 hole course, named Cougar Trail; and a par 34, nine-hole executive course, named Bobcat Run. The Panther Creek Championship Links Course has six different tees to choose from and features Florida's longest hole - a par 6 at 800 yards.

References
 
 

Unincorporated communities in Highlands County, Florida
Unincorporated communities in Florida